Mobile Computing and Communications Review (MC2R) is a peer-reviewed quarterly scientific journal and newsletter published by the ACM SIGMOBILE covering mobile computing and networking. The purpose of the journal is the rapid publication of completed or in-progress technical work, including  articles dealing with both research and practice. The journal also covers the status of major international standards in the field, and news of conferences and other events.

The current title is GetMobile

Indexing
As of 2017, it is not indexed by Scopus.

References

External links

 

Computer science journals
Association for Computing Machinery academic journals
Quarterly journals
English-language journals
Publications established in 1997